The International Deaf Education Association (IDEA) is an organization focused on educating the deaf in Bohol, Philippines initiated by the United States Peace Corps, under the leadership of Dennis Drake.  The organization is a non-profit establishment that provides education to the impoverished and neglected deaf and blind children in the Philippines.  The institution is able to hold special education classes on the islands of Bohol and Leyte through sponsorship program financially supported by American and European participants.  Established in 1985, IDEA has the mission to give assistance to the deaf community in the Philippines in order for them to achieve self-reliance through the provision of “academic, vocational, physical, spiritual, and economic opportunities”.  As a holistic ministry, IDEA aims to develop a society wherein deaf people can benefit from “social and economic equality, exchanging isolation for community, and servitude for self-reliance”.

See also
Philippine Sign Language
Philippine Federation of the Deaf
Bohol Deaf Academy, high school for the Deaf in Bohol, Philippines
Second International Congress on Education of the Deaf
Ulster Society for Promoting the Education of the Deaf and the Blind
Blindness and education

References

External links
Official website

1985 establishments in the Philippines
Organizations based in Bohol
Children's charities based in the Philippines
Educational institutions established in 1985
Schools for the deaf in the Philippines